Casier is a town and comune in the province of Treviso, Veneto region, in north-eastern Italy. The commune has its seat in Dosson di Casier, and includes the localities of Frescada (partially), Le Grazie (partially), La Sicilia, Cà Matte.

Culture

The Festa dello sloboz rosso di Frescada is held every year, between January and February .

Town twinning

 Eaunes, France, since 2002
 Slobozia, Romania, since 1315

Sources

 A. Dotto, G. B. Tozzato, Casier e Dosson nella storia, Grafiche Zoppelli, Dosson 1988.
 Giovanni Battista Tozzato, Pescatori e barcaroli sul Sile nel '300, Castello d'Amore, Treviso 1998.
 Giovanni Battista Tozzato, I Da Casier (sec. XII-XIV), Castello d'Amore, Treviso 2002.

Cities and towns in Veneto